Jatiya Ekata Party was a progressive left wing party in Bangladesh.

History
Jatiya Ekata Party was led by Suranjit Sengupta who was elected to the Bangladesh Parliament in 1979 on a nomination from the party. He was detained in 1981 under special powers act and released on 15 October 1982.

References

Jatiya Samajtantrik Dal
Political parties in Bangladesh
Socialist parties in Asia
Socialist parties in Bangladesh
Defunct political parties in Bangladesh